The 2007–08 Eastern Counties Football League season was the 66th in the history of Eastern Counties Football League, a football competition in England.

Premier Division

The Premier Division featured 19 clubs which competed in the division last season, along with three new clubs, promoted from Division One:
Haverhill Rovers
Swaffham Town
Walsham-le-Willows

Also, Kirkley changed name to Kirkley & Pakefield.

League table

Division One

Division One featured 16 clubs which competed in the division last season, along with three new clubs, relegated from the Premier Division:
Clacton Town, who also changed name to Clacton
Diss Town
Halstead Town

League table

References

External links
 Eastern Counties Football League

2007-08
9